Leap Day tornado outbreak can refer to:
Tornado outbreak of Leap Day 1952 - Struck the Southeastern United States, killing 5 
2012 Leap Day tornado outbreak  - Early season tornado outbreak in the Midwestern United States, killing 15